Waaijenberg (pronounced ʋɑjøʏnbɛrɣ) is a Dutch carmaker of micro cars, especially low-speed neighborhood-vehicles for wheelchair users and handicapped drivers. Founded in 1966 by Kees Waaijenberg, the firm is headquartered in Veenendaal, Netherlands.

In the 1970s and 1980s, it was popular for importing the Dutch version of Reliant Robin by the British carmaker Reliant. In 1978, the company started making vehicles for the disabled. From 1980 to 1996, they produced a vehicle called the Arola, which was rebadged from an Arola from a French carmaker. In 1995, they released a car called Canta, aimed at the disabled public.

Waaijenberg's microcars have a limited speed of 45 km/h, and are therefore not allowed to be driven on expressways and motorways. By the Dutch law, many of their microcars' drivers do not need a license.

Products since 1995

Canta
Inrij Canta
JDM
Microcar
Dué
Chatenet
Ligier
Aixam
Aixam Mega

References

External links
Official site

Car manufacturers of the Netherlands
Companies based in Utrecht (province)
Microcars
Dutch companies established in 1966
Vehicle manufacturing companies established in 1966
Veenendaal